Harvey Lavance Williams (born April 22, 1967), is a former professional American football running back for the Kansas City Chiefs and the Los Angeles/Oakland Raiders.

College career
Williams grew up in Hempstead, Texas, where he was touted as one of the country's top high school running back prospects in 1986. Williams was considered a lock to commit to nearby Texas A&M, but shocked everyone when he committed to LSU at the last minute on signing day.

The highly contested recruiting battle created a lot of bitterness between the two schools (LSU and Texas A&M had recently revived their yearly football rivalry). Because of it, Williams went to LSU in 1986 with outrageous, perhaps unrealistic, expectations. LSU fans were expecting a Heisman Trophy-caliber running back, but he never became one, partly because of knee injuries. Williams ran for over 2,800 yards in his 4 years at LSU, and is fifth in LSU history in career all-purpose yards. In his final season at LSU, he was named to the All-SEC team. The Kansas City Chiefs selected Williams in the first round of the 1991 NFL Draft.

Professional career
In his first two seasons, Barry Word and Christian Okoye consistently beat Williams out for playing time. In both seasons, he finished behind Word and Okoye in rushing yards. By 1993, Marcus Allen joined the team and became the starter.

In 1994, Williams moved on to the Los Angeles Raiders. He finally received a chance to be a starter, and responded with two good seasons. He rushed for 983 yards in 1994. He followed up this season with his only 1,000-yard rushing season, rushing for 1,114 yards and 9 touchdowns in 1995.

After 1995, Williams lost his starting job to another first round pick, Napoleon Kaufman, and was eventually moved to tight end. In 1997, he had perhaps his most memorable game as a pro, scoring 4 touchdowns in a 38–13 win over the San Diego Chargers. He stayed with the Raiders until his release after the 1998 NFL season.

NFL career statistics

References

External links
 LSU Tigers bio

1967 births
Living people
People from Hempstead, Texas
American football running backs
LSU Tigers football players
Kansas City Chiefs players
Los Angeles Raiders players
Oakland Raiders players
Ed Block Courage Award recipients